David Morgan Lochhead (18 June 1936 – 15 June 1999) was born in Montreal, where he attended McGill University. En route to his degrees in science, theology and philosophy of religion, he also studied at Union College, and in Oxford and Chicago. Ordained in 1962, he served two United Church parishes in Quebec and Ontario. At an unusually early stage in his career, David was named to that role of "teacher of the church" which he never relinquished, holding posts at St. Paul's College, Waterloo, Coughlan College, St. John's, Newfoundland, and from 1978 at Vancouver School of Theology. These were the institutions that served as his base; the world of religious thought and life was his parish. David was no "ivory-tower" academic. He thought with and for the Church. To peruse his publications is to identify issues that were central in Canadian Christian life during the more than thirty years of his professional ministry. In the `70's he wrote two small and highly influential books: The Liberation of the Bible. called us to free Scripture from the spiritual strait-jackets into which we had placed it; while The Lordship of Jesus challenged liberal Canadian churches to wrestle seriously with the meaning of their Christology.

David wore his Reformed heritage proudly; yet, his was never a parochial identity. By the mid-80s, partnering with the American theologian John Cobb, he was at the forefront of Buddhist-Christian encounter. Out of this experience came his important 1988 work, The Dialogical Imperative. When the First Nation peoples of the north-west coast invited VST to partner with them in finding an innovative way to prepare leadership for Christian ministry in their communities, David gave energetic and imaginative support on the team which created VST's Native Ministries Degree Programme.

David also thought ahead of the Church. Most of us were probably bemused when David first began to explore the new world of cybernetics. His revolutionary thinking about Theology in a Digital World, and the new possibilities of human community that would emerge with the World-Wide Web finally received overdue international recognition in 1998, when he was made the recipient of a prestigious Lilly Foundation Grant, as a Faculty Fellow. Tragically, the work this award was to sponsor was cut dramatically short just a year later, when David suffered a cerebral hemorrhage, and died three days short of his 63rd birthday.

 Lochhead taught at the Vancouver School of Theology since 1978. He was the executive director of the Institute for Religion, Technology and Culture and was the founding president of ECUNET, the interdenominational computer network. 
His books include

The Liberation of the Bible. Toronto: Student Christian Movement of Canada, 1977
Living Between Memory and Hope. Toronto: United Church Publishing House, 1980
The Dialogical Imperative. Maryknoll, NY: Orbis, 1988
Theology in a Digital World. Toronto: United Church Publishing House, 1988
Shifting Realities: Information Technology and the Church. Geneva: World Council of Churches, Risk Books, 1997

Lochhead was Professor of Theology at Vancouver School of Theology having taught at the theological school since 1978.  In 2006, Lochhead was awarded posthumously the title of professor emeritus by the Vancouver School of Theology.

References

Members of the United Church of Canada
Vancouver School of Theology
Canadian Protestant theologians
1936 births
1999 deaths